See also Filippo Buonarroti (1661–1733).

Filippo Giuseppe Maria Ludovico Buonarroti, more usually referred to under the French version Philippe Buonarroti (11 November 1761 – 16 September 1837), was an Italian utopian socialist, writer, agitator, freemason, and conspirator; he was active in Corsica, France, and Geneva. His History of Babeuf’s Conspiracy of Equals (1828) became a quintessential text for revolutionaries, inspiring such socialists as Blanqui and Marx.  He proposed a mutualist strategy that would revolutionize society by stages, starting from monarchy to liberalism, then to radicalism, and finally to communism.

Life

Early activism 
Born in Pisa in the Grand Duchy of Tuscany to a family of local nobility, Buonarroti studied jurisprudence at the University of Pisa, where he founded what was seen by the authorities of Grand Duke Peter Leopold as a subversive paper, the Gazetta Universale (1787).

It is thought that he joined a Masonic Lodge some time in 1786.

Though under constant surveillance by the authorities, he expressed support for the French Revolution when it broke out.  He traveled to Corsica to spread the revolutionary message with the Giornale Patriottico di Corsica, the first Italian-language paper to openly support the French Revolution. In Corsica, Buonarroti joined the Jacobin Club, and became a friend of the Bonapartes.

Under the Convention 
Buonarroti was expelled from the island in June 1791 and returned to his native Tuscany whereupon he was arrested and imprisoned.

In 1793 he traveled to Paris and became a member of the Society of the Panthéon. Maximilien Robespierre placed him in charge of organizing the expatriate Italian revolutionaries, which he did from a base in Nice. After denouncing Pasquale Paoli to the National Convention, he was rewarded for his revolutionary activities by a special decree of French citizenship in May 1793.

In April 1794 he was nominated National Commissioner in Oneglia, Imperia's port, the site of refuge for many pro-French Italians during the French attack on Northern Italy.

Babeuf conspiracy and later life 
He was recalled to Paris in 1795, after the Thermidorian Reaction, whereupon he was imprisoned in the Plessis prison after his friends in office had been deposed by the Thermidorian Reaction. There he met Gracchus Babeuf, and became one of his most fervent supporters and co-conspirators during the time of their mutual imprisonment from March to October.

Buonarotti was rearrested by the French Directory on 8 May 1796, along with Babeuf and other conspirators. Babeuf was guillotined, and Buonarotti formally imprisoned in February 1797, and held on the island of Oléron. Napoleon Bonaparte allowed him to go free after he had become First Consul in 1799.

He exiled himself to Geneva during the Empire, and to Brussels during the Bourbon Restoration. In 1808 Buonarroti formed a Masonic Lodge, Les Sublimes Maîtres Parfaits (The Sublime Perfect Masters), to which only serving freemasons were admitted. Within this lodge he formed an inner circle which he used to further his political dreams and aspirations. He returned to Paris after the 1830 July Revolution.

He died suddenly in Paris.

Influence 

Buonarroti's revolutionary principles were to prove important during the 1830s and early 1840s; Auguste Blanqui learned many of his insurrectionary skills and tactics from Buonarroti, and the Conspiration pour l'Egalité dite de Babeuf, suivie du procès auquel elle donna lieu may be seen as an important text in this respect.

Later, the 1848 revolutionaries in France and elsewhere placed much emphasis on this work as a cornerstone.

Mikhail Bakunin praised Buonarroti as "the greatest conspirator of his age", and was heavily influenced by the revolutionary practice of Buonarroti. The Bakunin scholar Arthur Lehning has written of Buonarroti: “He too built up on an international scale, though over a much longer period, an elaborate underground network, on a freemason pattern, sometimes using Masonic institutions, to work for his egalitarian creed of 1796, for a social revolution and for the republicanisation of Europe. For forty years the principles remained the same: the leadership was secret; the existence of the higher grades was unknown to the lower; protean in character, this network took advantage of and used other societies.” Some argue that these principles are clearly evident in Bakunin's writings.

Writings 
 La Riforma dell'Alcorano (1786)
 Conspiration des égaux (1828)
 Histoire de la Conspiration pour l'Égalité dite de Babeuf (1828)
 Riflessi sul governo federativo applicato all'Italia (1831)
 Del governo d'un popolo in rivolta per conseguire la libertà (1833)
 Observations sur Maximilien Robespierre (1836)

 See also 

 Conspiracy of the Equals

 Notes 

 References 
 Alexander Philippe Andryane (1839). Mémoires d'un prisonnier d'état.
 Souvenirs de Genève (1839).
 
 Libero Federici (2007). L'egualitarismo di Filippo Buonarroti''. Il Prato. Saonara, Padova.

1761 births
1837 deaths
People from Pisa
Italian emigrants to France
Italian Freemasons
19th-century Italian journalists
Italian male journalists
Italian memoirists
Italian socialists
Revolution theorists
People involved in the Conspiracy of the Equals
19th-century Italian writers
19th-century Italian male writers
Writers from Tuscany
University of Pisa alumni
Utopian socialists
Italian exiles
18th-century Italian journalists
Neo-Babouvism
Italian deists